Cariboo District was a federal electoral district in British Columbia, Canada, that was represented in the House of Commons of Canada from 1871 to 1872.

It was created when the province of British Columbia joined Confederation in 1871. Like other ridings established in that year, a byelection was called to fill the seat until the general election of 1872. The riding constituted all of the Lillooet and Cariboo Land Districts (identical with the provincial electoral districts of those names at the time), meaning everything north and inland from Howe Sound and north of the Thompson River, all the way to the Yukon border excepting the Coast.

The 1871 names were all temporary pending ratification of the riding system by the provincial legislature. When they became mandated the riding names were simplified, Cariboo District's becoming simply Cariboo, and the same pattern was followed by the other temporary names, Victoria District, New Westminster District, and Yale District, which became the ridings of Victoria, New Westminster, and Yale for the general election the following year.  The riding comprising Vancouver Island became the riding of Vancouver.

By the 1872 election the riding boundaries had been properly legislated and renamed. Cariboo District became Cariboo.

Election results

External links 
Elections Canada historical returns for BC ridings in 1871

Former federal electoral districts of British Columbia